Alcobaça is a Portuguese city and municipality in the Oeste region, in the historical province of Estremadura, and in the Leiria District. The city grew along the valleys of the rivers Alcoa and Baça, from which it derives its name. The city proper has a population of 15,800 inhabitants.

The city of Alcobaça became notable after the first king of Portugal, Afonso Henriques, decided to build a church to commemorate the Conquest of Santarém from the Moors in 1147. The church later evolved into the Monastery of Alcobaça, one of the most magnificent gothic monuments in the country. In the church are the tombs of Pedro I of Portugal and his murdered mistress Inês de Castro. Over the centuries this monastery played an important role in shaping Portuguese culture.

A few kilometers to the north of Alcobaça is the Monastery of Batalha, another gothic building constructed in memory of a different important battle, that of Aljubarrota. To the west of Alcobaça is the fishing village of Nazaré, now a popular resort town. To the south is the city of Caldas da Rainha and the medieval town of Óbidos. Also to the northeast is the town of Porto de Mós with its rebuilt castle.

History 
A town that only became notable in the 12th century when it was chosen as the future site of Portugal's largest church. In March 1147, the fledgling King Dom Afonso Henriques, defeated the Moors by capturing the city of Santarém. As a tribute to his victory he vowed to build a magnificent home for the Order of Cistercians. It took another 76 years before this task was completed. The monarchy continued to carry out further construction and 60 years later King Dinis built the main cloister. The Monastery was consecrated in 1262.

The church contains the tombs of Pedro I of Portugal and his murdered mistress Inês de Castro and with it the story of the tragic liaison between Pedro and Inês. Forced at an early age as a royal duty, he was to marry Constanza, the Infanta (Princess) of Castile, but died shortly after the marriage. Dom Pedro escape with his true love and later lived in the city of Coimbra. His father, King Afonso IV, believing that the family of Inês was a threat to his own kingdom had her murdered. Shortly after the death of his father Dom Pedro declared that he had married Inês in a prior secret ceremony in Bragança, and promptly took a gruesome revenge on the  killers and exhumed her body. He presented the embalmed corpse at the court with a crown on her head and demanded that all his courtiers kneel and individually pay homage to her decomposed hand. Today, their ornate tombs face each other so that on Judgment Day his first sight would be of his beloved Inês.

During the following centuries the monks from this monastery had a major influence on the development of Portuguese culture. Notably, in 1269 they were the first to give public lessons to their flock, and later they produced the first authoritative history on Portugal in a series of books. In 1810 the invading French pillaged the Abbey taking with them most of its most important treasures, including the noteworthy library. The items that remained were later stolen in 1834 during an anti-clerical riot and the banning of the religious Orders in Portugal.

Climate
Alcobaça has a Mediterranean climate (Köppen:Csb) with warm, dry summers and mild, wet winters.

Parishes
Administratively, the municipality is divided into 13 civil parishes (freguesias):

 Alcobaça e Vestiaria
 Alfeizerão
 Aljubarrota
 Bárrio
 Benedita
 Cela
 Coz, Alpedriz e Montes
 Évora de Alcobaça
 Maiorga
 Pataias e Martingança
 São Martinho do Porto
 Turquel
 Vimeiro

City information
The main feature of the city is essentially the monastery that proudly presents a long and sombre façade with 18th-century embellishments. This austerity is further emphasized in the cloisters with its apt name of "Cloister of Silence". In contrast within the Abbey is the massive kitchen with a running stream specially diverted to pass through as a supply of fresh water. The open area of the kitchen chimney is large enough to take a whole ox for roasting. The surround to the sacristy doorway is an outstanding example of Manueline decoration. In 1794, Lord Beckford visited the Abbey and commented that he found some 300 monks "living in a very splendid manner"!

Nearby locations 

A few kilometers to the north of Alcobaça is another wondrous building constructed in memory of a different important battle, that of Aljubarrota in 1385, when King John I of Portugal defeated the Castilians and ensuring two hundred years of independence from the Castilian invaders. The construction of the Abbey at Batalha commenced in 1388 and was added to by various Portuguese Kings over these next two centuries. To the east of Batalha is the world-famous location of Fátima and a point of pilgrimage for the Roman Catholic religion due to the vision of the Virgin Mary in 1917 by three young children whilst tending their flock. To the west of Alcobaça is the well-known fishing village of Nazaré. Today, the village is now a small town and a popular holiday resort with most of its past and traditions having rapidly evaporated in the course of time. A very successful Portuguese feature film was made in the early 20th century that dramatically captured the primitive and dangerous life of these fishermen. Stoutly Catholic, the inhabitants have retained some of their past as can be still seen in their own particular style of costume. To the south is Caldas da Rainha and the quaint medieval town of Óbidos that is an attraction for any tourists that enjoys a true glimpse of the past. Also to the south is the town of Porto de Mós with its fanciful rebuilt castle. This town borders the Nature Reserve Parque Natural das Serras de Aire e Candeeiros. These 390 square kilometres of limestone-covered landscape is also known for its caverns. The best known being the Grutas de Mira de Aire can be visited and consists of tunnels, caverns with stalactites, stalagmites, lakes, and a music and light finale.

Major events 
 Market days – Every Monday
 Carnaval de Alcobaça – February/March
 Cistermúsica – classical music festival – June / July
 Saint Bernard's fair – August 20
 Municipal holiday – August 20
 Marionetas na Cidade – puppetry festival – mid-October
 Saint Simon's fair – 4th week of October
 International display of Sweets and Conventual Liqueurs – November

Notable people from Alcobaça

 Joaquim Ferreira Bogalho (1889–1977) the 20th president of S.L. Benfica
 Virgínia Vitorino, (Wiki PT) (1895-1967) a teacher, poet and playwright. 
 Joaquim Vieira de Natividade, (Wiki PT) (1899-1968) an agricultural engineer
 José Aurélio, (Wiki PT) (born 1938) a sculptor, works in stone, wood and bronze
 João Lourenço (born 1942) a former footballer with 207 club caps 
 Alberto Costa (born 1947) politician, Minister of Justice, 2005-2009.
 João Traquina (born 1988) a Portuguese footballer with over 350 club caps
 João Pedro Silva (born 1989) a Portuguese professional triathlete, competed at the 2012 Summer Olympics 
 The Gift (formed 1994) a Portuguese alternative rock band
 Loto (formed 2002) an electro-pop-rock-dance music band
 Spartak! (2006–2008) a musical collective from Alcobaça
 JÜRA Popular pop artist based in Lisbon

International relations

Alcobaça is twinned with:
 Aubergenville, France
 Bełchatów, Poland
 Cacuaco, Angola
 Chicopee, United States

See also

Alcobaça IPR
Monastery of Alcobaça
Monastery of Batalha
Nazaré

References

External links

Municipality official website

 
Populated places in Leiria District
Cities in Portugal
Centro Region
Municipalities of Leiria District
World Heritage Sites in Portugal
UNESCO